Shadow Game or variants may refer to:

Shadow Game (CBS Playhouse), a 1969 teleplay as part of the CBS Playhouse series

Books
Shadow Games (novel), the 1989 novel by Glen Cook
Shadow Game (novel), the 2003 novel by Christine Feehan
Shadow Games, a 1990s novel by Ed Gorman
Shadow Games and Other Sinister Stories of Show Business, a 2016 short story collection by Ed Gorman
Shadow Games, a 2011 Star Wars Legends novel by Michael Reaves and Maya Kaathryn Bohnhoff
The Shadow Game series (novels), the 2018-2020 trilogy by Amanda Foody

Other
A type of game played in Yu-Gi-Oh!